The men's 5000 metres at the 2013 World Championships in Athletics was held at the Luzhniki Stadium on 13 and 16 August.

Fifteen qualified for the final.  Of the ten automatic qualifiers, three each were from Kenya, Ethiopia and the United States.  But all eyes were on the one from England, the defending champion, Olympic champion and 10000 winner from these championships all rolled up into one Mo Farah.

The first lap of the final started off at a jog for these world class competitors.  On the second lap, the Kenyans as a group pushed the pace, but it didn't last long and the pack reformed.  At such a leisurely pace, nobody was at risk of getting dropped.  Instead confusion.  Hagos Gebrhiwet literally a step behind Farah near the back of the pack, watching his every step.  At 2000 meters, Farah decided to take a chance at the lead, but it was not to advance the pace but to slow it down.  With Farah at the front the pace slowed to 68 seconds, then almost 70 seconds and the rest of the field obediently crowded up behind him, not willing to go out alone against the king.  With 5 laps to go, Isiah Koech decided to make the break and took off.  The race accelerated to 62-second laps with all the players covering each other's move and jockeying for position.  For a lap Yenew Alamirew held the lead, accelerating as anyone looked to try to pass.  With 650 to go, Farah made his move, successfully passing Alamirew he only gained a step on the field but that was enough, now he wouldn't let anybody pass him, the field stinging out behind him, the suitors dwindling.  Through the final lap in 53 seconds, Koech made repeated attempts to get past Farah but each time Farah was able to go that much faster.  Two steps behind at the beginning of the straight, Gebrhiwet weaved his way around the other two Kenyans and came flying down the outside as Koech let up in defeat, Gebrhiwet taking silver by one thousandth of a second after 5000 meters.

Records
Prior to the competition, the records were as follows:

Qualification standards

Schedule

Results

Heats
Qualification: First 5 in each heat (Q) and the next 5 fastest (q) advanced to the final.

Final
The final was started at 20:45.

References

External links
5000 metres results at IAAF website

5000
5000 metres at the World Athletics Championships